The Little Master may refer to:

People 
Clive Churchill (1927–1985), Australian rugby league footballer and coach
Sachin Tendulkar (born 1973), Indian cricketer
Hanif Mohammad (1934–2016), Pakistani cricketer
Sunil Gavaskar (born 1949), Indian cricketer
Gary Ablett Jr. (born 1984), Australian rules footballer
Remco Evenepoel (born 2000), Belgian cyclist

Other uses
Little Masters ("Kleinmeister"), a group of 16th German artists in engraving
Little Masters (Greek vase painting), a group of potters and vase painters active in Athens approximately 560 — 530 BC

See also 
Little mester, a self-employed worker who rents space in a factory or works from their own workshop